Kathleen Marie Creighton (born 1966) is a United States Navy rear admiral who most recently served as the Director of Warfare Integration of the United States Navy from September 18, 2020 to August 21, 2021. Previously, she served as the Deputy Commander of the Joint Force Headquarters–Department of Defense Information Networks from August 2017 to August 2019.

Raised in Ridgefield, Connecticut, Creighton attended Ridgefield High School. She graduated from the University of Notre Dame in 1988 with a Bachelor of Business Administration degree and was commissioned through the NROTC program. Creighton later earned an M.S. degree in information technology management from the Naval Postgraduate School in 1997.

Personal 
Kathleen Traynor married Craig Calderwood Creighton on October 21, 1989 in Ridgefield, Connecticut. Her husband was a naval surface warfare officer who retired from active duty as a lieutenant commander.

References

External links

1966 births
Living people
Place of birth missing (living people)
People from Ridgefield, Connecticut
Mendoza College of Business alumni
Naval Postgraduate School alumni
Recipients of the Legion of Merit
Female admirals of the United States Navy
Recipients of the Defense Superior Service Medal
21st-century American women